George "Malmo" Malley (born July 28, 1955) is an American long-distance runner.  He held American records in the 3000m steeplechase, 12 km, and half marathon.

Early career 

George Malley graduated from DuVal High School in Lanham, Maryland in 1973. He began competing in track and field and cross country his sophomore year. The DuVal High School cross-country team was ranked ninth and fifth nationally during his junior and senior years. He would set personal bests of 4:16.4 in the mile and 9:10.2 in the two mile.

Malley attended Penn State University, where he was a five-time All-America, and broke the American record in the steeplechase with his 8:22.54 at the 1977 AAU National Championships in Westwood, California. In the summer of 1977 he improved his mile personal best to 4:00.5 in Berlin, Germany.

He was ranked sixth in the world in the 3000m steeplechase event by Track & Field News for 1977

Professional career 

1978 Malley would run the steeplechase in 8:21.72, narrowly missing the new record of 8:21.55 set by Henry Marsh, and lowered his 1500-meter best to 3:40.21 just two days later.

1981 began with a New Years Day attempt on Bill Rodgers American Record at 15,000 m (43:39.8) in Palo Alto, CA. Malley would fall 3 seconds short with his 43:43.2 On March 15, in Cherry Hill, NJ, he would tie the existing 10 mile AR of 47:02 held by Herb Lindsay in a losing effort to fellow steeplechaser Mike Roche, who established the new mark with his 46:57. On March 21 he would set the American 12 km record with his 35:10 over a hilly course in Holyoke, MA.  While preparing for the 1981 IAAF World Cross Country Championships Malley would tear his plantar fascia. He still ran the race, finishing 51st, helping the US team win the silver medal. It was the highest finish, and remains the lowest 6-man score by a US team in World Cross Country competition.

In 1982 he set the American record in the half-marathon, a 1:01:43 in Philadelphia on September 19, losing to Michael Musyoki of Kenya in world record time (1:01:35) and eclipsing the old world record of 1:01:47 set by Herb Lindsay. He followed that with a 2:13:29 marathon debut in New York City. He would run his lifetime best of 2:12:23 in Sacramento in 1985.

Nickname 

In 1978 Malley defeated Swedish Olympic steeplechase runner Dan Glans in his hometown of Malmö, which earned him the nickname Malmo.

Personal bests

References

1955 births
Living people
Place of birth missing (living people)
American male long-distance runners
American male marathon runners
American male steeplechase runners
Penn State Nittany Lions men's track and field athletes
People from Lanham, Maryland
Track and field athletes from Maryland